The Finnish Defence Forces switched over to the NATO phonetic alphabet in 2005, but the Finnish one is used for Å, Ä, Ö and digits. International operations use only the NATO alphabet.

On the Finnish rail network the Finnish Armed Forces spelling alphabet was used until May 31, 2020 and starting on July 1 the railways switched to NATO phonetic alphabet, but still retained Finnish spelling words for Å, Ä, Ö and numbers.

See also
 Radio alphabet
 Swedish Armed Forces' phonetic alphabet

References

Spelling alphabets
Military communications
Radio alphabet